Uillian Correia Granemann (born 27 September 1989), known as Uillian Correia or simply Uillian, is a Brazilian footballer who plays as a midfielder for CRB.

Club career
Born in Fátima do Sul, Mato Grosso do Sul, Uillian Correia was an Atlético Paranaense youth graduate. He made his debuts as a senior with Rio Branco-PR in 2010, and subsequently represented Santa Cruz-RS and Pelotas.

On 24 April 2012 Uillian Correia moved abroad, signing a three-year deal with Primeira Liga side F.C. Paços de Ferreira. On 23 January of the following year, after making no league appearances for the side, he was loaned to C.D. Feirense in Segunda Liga until June.

On 31 January 2014 Uillian Correia signed for Sampaio Corrêa. An undisputed starter, he appeared in 34 matches and scored two goals for the club.

On 13 January 2015 Uillian Correia joined Ceará, after agreeing to a three-year contract. On 28 August he moved to Série A team Cruzeiro, for a R$ 1.5 million fee. With lack of opportunity at Cruzeiro, he was loaned out to Santa Cruz in March 2016, as part of a deal which saw Raniel move in the opposite direction. He was loaned out again the following season to Vitória. In December 2017 he terminated his contract with Cruzeiro and made his move to Vitória permanent by signing a two-year deal.

Despite being captain of Vitória for the 2017 Campeonato Brasileiro Série A campaign, and playing 28 matches in the first half of 2018, Uillian Correia was loaned to Coritiba in June 2018, with the deal lasting until December but with the option to extend should Coritiba win promotion. He returned to Vitória, now in Série B for 2019, but was not in the plans of the manager, and had too high a salary, so he was loaned to Red Bull Brasil, initially for the 2019 Campeonato Paulista, but with an option to extend to the end of the year. He became part of the Red Bull Bragantino squad when Red Bull Brasil merged with Clube Atlético Bragantino in April 2019.

Honours
Sampaio Corrêa
Campeonato Maranhense: 2014

Ceará
Copa do Nordeste: 2015

Santa Cruz
Copa do Nordeste: 2016
Campeonato Pernambucano: 2016

Vitória
Campeonato Baiano: 2017

Red Bull Bragantino
Campeonato Brasileiro Série B: 2019

Cuiabá
Campeonato Mato-Grossense: 2021

References

External links

1989 births
Living people
Sportspeople from Mato Grosso do Sul
Brazilian footballers
Association football midfielders
Campeonato Brasileiro Série A players
Campeonato Brasileiro Série B players
Rio Branco Sport Club players
Cuiabá Esporte Clube players
Futebol Clube Santa Cruz players
Esporte Clube Pelotas players
Sampaio Corrêa Futebol Clube players
Ceará Sporting Club players
Cruzeiro Esporte Clube players
Santa Cruz Futebol Clube players
Red Bull Brasil players
Coritiba Foot Ball Club players
Red Bull Bragantino players
Associação Ferroviária de Esportes players
Clube de Regatas Brasil players
Liga Portugal 2 players
F.C. Paços de Ferreira players
C.D. Feirense players
Brazilian expatriate footballers
Brazilian expatriate sportspeople in Portugal
Expatriate footballers in Portugal